Strength of Materials is a bimonthly peer-reviewed scientific journal covering the field of strength of materials and structural elements, mechanics solid deformed body. It was established in 1969 and is published by Springer Science+Business Media on behalf of the Pisarenko Institute of Problems of Strength of the National Academy of Sciences of Ukraine. The editor-in-chief is V.V. Kharchenko. According to the Journal Citation Reports, the journal has a 2020 impact factor of 0.620.

References

External links
 

Springer Science+Business Media academic journals
Publications established in 1969
Multilingual journals
Bimonthly journals
Materials science journals
Academic journals published in Ukraine